The 1st is the second studio album by American singer Willow. It was released on October 31, 2017, through MSFTSMusic, Roc Nation and Interscope Records. It was written and produced entirely by Willow.

Background
The album was released on Willow's 17th birthday, noting that the making of this album was putting her in uncomfortable positions, and is much more raw and organic. Her vocal performances were inspired by Alanis Morissette and Tori Amos.

Critical reception

The 1st received a favorable review from Cameron Cook of Pitchfork. Cook gave the album a 6.7 and noted that the "more organic and raw" sound on the album was a "huge leap in the right direction".

Track listing
All tracks written and produced by Willow Smith, except where noted.

Personnel
 Willow – vocals, production
 Devonte Hynes – vocals, production (track 6)
 Chloe Bailey – vocals (track 9)
 Halle Bailey – vocals (track 9)
 James Chul Rim – mixing

References

2017 albums
Willow Smith albums
Roc Nation albums
Rock albums by American artists
Soul albums by American artists
Pop albums by American artists